Chionodes nigrobarbata is a moth in the family Gelechiidae. It is found in North America, where it has been recorded from Alberta and British Columbia to Colorado and Oregon.

References

Chionodes
Moths described in 1925
Moths of North America